Abdulaziz bin Mohieddin Khoja (born 1940) is a former Saudi ambassador and the minister of culture and information between 2009 and 2014.

Early life and education
Khoja was born in Mecca in 1940. He obtained a bachelor of science degree from King Saud University. Then he earned a master of science degree in organic chemistry in Birmingham University in 1967. He also holds a PhD in organic chemistry at Birmingham University in 1969.

Career
Khoja was appointed dean of the faculty of education in Mecca in 1979, and his term lasted until 1984. Then he served as the undersecretary for information affairs at the ministry of information from 1984 to 1991. Later, he served as the Saudi Ambassador to various countries, including Turkey (1991), Russia and Morocco. He was also Saudi ambassador to Lebanon and was in office from 2004 to 2009. During this period of time, King Abdullah's foreign policy towards Lebanon was highly intense and also seen as an interventionist approach. On 14 February 2009, Khoja was appointed minister of culture and information, replacing Iyad bin Amin Madani in the post who had been in office since February 2005. Khoja's appointment was regarded as part of King Abdullah's reform initiatives. 

Khoja's term as the minister of culture and information ended in November 2014 when he was fired from the office. Abdulaziz bin Abdullah Al Khudairi replaced him in the post on 8 December 2014.

Khoja is considered to be a relative liberal and was close to King Abdullah, former ruler of Saudi Arabia. Khoja is also a poet. However, some of his works are banned in Saudi Arabia, although he himself was the minister of culture and information.

Other positions
Khoja was the chairman of the General Assembly of Makkah Establishment for Publishing and Printing, publisher of now-defunct newspaper Al Nadwa. As of 2011 he was also the chairman of the International Islamic News Agency (IINA) Executive Council.

Book
In 2020 Khoja published his memoirs printed by Jadawel, a Beirut-based company.

References

External links

20th-century chemists
20th-century diplomats
Abdulaziz
21st-century diplomats
Abdulaziz
1940 births
Abdulaziz
Ambassadors of Saudi Arabia to Lebanon
Ambassadors of Saudi Arabia to Morocco
Ambassadors of Saudi Arabia to Russia
Ambassadors of Saudi Arabia to Turkey
Abdulaziz
Abdulaziz
Abdulaziz
Living people
People from Mecca